Glaucis is a genus of hummingbird in the family Trochilidae.

Taxonomy
The genus Glaucis was introduced in 1831 by the German zoologist Friedrich Boie. The type species was designated as the rufous-breasted hermit by George Robert Gray in 1840. The genus name is from the Ancient Greek glaukos meaning "blue-grey", "glaucous" or "pale green".

The genus contains the following three species:

References

 
Bird genera
Taxonomy articles created by Polbot